Standesamt Rawitsch is one of several civil registration districts (Standesamt) located in Kreis Rawitsch of the Prussian province of Posen and administered the communities of:

At the junction of rail lines to Posen and Liegnitz.

An important industry was the manufacture of snuff and cigars. Trade involved grain, wool, cattle, hides, and timber.

External links
Rawitsch from a Jewish history perspective, with photos and a map

Civil registration offices in the Province of Posen